Georg Jacob Bull (born 1 August 1785 in Christiania, died 12 December 1854) was a Norwegian jurist and politician.

He was a stipendiary magistrate (byfogd) of Bergen from 1810 to 1821. While stationed here, he was elected to the Norwegian Parliament for the year 1821. Bull was then appointed County Governor of Jarlsbergs og Laurvigs amt (today named Vestfold), serving from 1821 to 1829. Seated in Laurvik, he was elected to the Norwegian Parliament for the year 1824, representing the constituency of Laurvik og Sandefjord.

In 1829 he went on to serve as County Governor of Søndre Bergenhus amt (today named Hordaland). He left in 1834. From 1834 to 1836 he served as state secretary. He was then the fourth Chief Justice of the Supreme Court of Norway from 1836 to his death in 1854.

Georg Jacob Bull was the father of later government minister Anders Sandøe Ørsted Bull. His wife, and Anders' mother, was Barbara Albertine Ørsted, sister of Hans Christian Ørsted and Anders Sandøe Ørsted.

References

1785 births
1854 deaths
Members of the Storting
County governors of Norway
Politicians from Bergen
Vestfold politicians
Chief justices of Norway